Conga is a genus of skippers in the family Hesperiidae.

Species
Recognised species in the genus Conga include:
 Conga chydaea (Butler, 1877)
 Conga immaculata (Bell, 1930)
 Conga urqua (Schaus, 1902)
 Conga zela (Plötz, 1883)

References

Natural History Museum Lepidoptera genus database

Hesperiini
Hesperiidae genera